Xenodon merremii, also known commonly as Wagler's snake, is a species of snake in the subfamily Dipsadinae of the family Colubridae. The species is endemic to South America and is widespread in the eastern half of the continent.

Geographic range
X. merremii occurs in Venezuela, Guyana, Suriname, French Guiana, Brazil, Bolivia, Paraguay, Uruguay, and northern Argentina.

Etymology
The specific name, merremii, is in honor of German herpetologist Blasius Merrem.

Description
Adults of X. merremii are usually  or less in total length (including tail). Its color pattern is very variable. Some "red phase" specimens are a uniform reddish tan. Other specimens are pale brown dorsally, with broad dark-brown crossbands, which are edged with black, and are narrower or interrupted in the middle. The latter color pattern resembles that of the venomous snake Bothrops alternatus.

Diet
X. merremii preys on insects, frogs, toads, lizards, and sometimes snakes. Like other rear-fanged toad-eaters of the genera Heterodon and Lystrophis, X. merremii uses its enlarged posterior maxillary teeth to puncture and deflate toads which have defensively puffed themselves up, thereby making them easier to swallow.

Defensive behavior
When threatened, X. merremii raises the anterior part of its body, inflating and spreading its neck, similar to a cobra.

Reproduction
X. merremii is oviparous.

References

Further reading
Boulenger GA (1894). Catalogue of the Snakes in the British Museum (Natural History). Volume II., Containing the Conclusion of the Colubridæ Aglyphæ. London: Trustees of the British Museum (Natural History). (Taylor and Francis, printers). xi + 382 pp. + Plates I-XX. (Xenodon merremii, pp. 150–151).
Freiberg M (1982). Snakes of South America. Hong Kong: T.F.H. Publications. 189 pp. . (Waglerophis merremii, pp. 113, 144 + photographs on pp. 21, 159, 162).
Wagler J (1824). In: Spix J (1824). Serpentum Brasiliensum species novae ou histoire naturelle des espèces nouvelles de serpens, recueillies et observées pendant le voyage dans l'intérieur du Brésil dans les années 1817, 1818, 1819, 1820, exécuté par ordre de sa Majesté le Roi de Baviére. Munich: F.S. Hübschmann. viii + 75 pp. + Plates I-XXVI. (Ophis merremii, new species, p. 47 + Plate XVII). (in Latin).
Wallach V, Williams KL, Boundy J (2014). Snakes of the World: A Catalogue of Living and Extinct Species. Boca Raton, Florida: CRC Press. xxviii + 1,209 pp. . (Xenodon merremii, p. 785).

Colubrids
Snakes of South America
Reptiles of Argentina
Reptiles of Bolivia
Reptiles of Brazil
Reptiles of French Guiana
Reptiles of Guyana
Reptiles of Paraguay
Reptiles of Suriname
Reptiles of Uruguay
Reptiles of Venezuela
Reptiles described in 1824
Taxa named by Johann Georg Wagler